Vučić (() is a South Slavic surname.

Notable people with the surname include:

 Aleksandar Vučić (born 1970), Serbian politician, President of Serbia
 Borka Vučić (1926–2009), Serbian politician, was acting President of the National Assembly of the Republic of Serbia
 Dragan Vučić (born 1955), Serbian-Macedonian composer and singer
 Ivan Bunić Vučić (1591–1658), aka Đivo Sarov, a Croatian politician and poet from the Republic of Ragusa
 Martin Vučić, Pop musician from the Republic of Macedonia
 Sanja Vučić, Serbian singer 
 Toma Vučić Perišić (1787–1859), Serbian politician and military leader

See also
 Vučević
 Vukić

Serbian surnames